The Unbeatables III is a 30-episode Singaporean drama serial which was telecast in November 2002.

Produced by Mediacorp, the drama is the third and last drama in The Unbeatables series, and was broadcast six years after The Unbeatables II

Synopsis
Since the defeat of Ye Zhong in the previous series, Yan Fei has retired from the gambling scene, leaving Coral Island with his wife, Luo Qifang and his son, Yan Xing. However, Qifang was embroiled in a mysterious murder case at a casino, and was sentenced to life imprisonment at a prison located on a remote island. Fei, however, made efforts to see Qifang during all visitation dates, rain or shine.

A decade later, Fei has become a big philanthropist on Coral Island, taking an active role in charitable endeavours, as well as building bridges and repairing roads. Fei also donates 90% of the casino's proceeds to the government, and also forbade Coral Island locals from losing large sums of cash at his casino. As a result, Fei was praised by islanders as a philanthropic gambling king.

Fei's philanthropic endeavours, however, were done for one purpose: to effect Qifang's release from prison by impressing political figures on Coral Island. Meanwhile, gambling figures from abroad arrived at Coral Island to challenge Fei, and attempted to force him to hand over the gambling license he has held for years. One of Fei's challengers is Luo Shenfeng. Fei, however, resisted all challenges, knowing his operation of the gambling business is Qifang's only hope of a release from prison.

Fei's son, Yan Xing, returned from abroad and now grown up, with a dream of following his dad's footstep as a gambling king. Fei, disappointed, forbade his son to do so, and also refused to pass on any of his skills to him, out of a fear that Xing would become entangled in the affairs of the gambling scene. Instead, Fei passed on his gambling skills to three disciples: Wu Youkang, Dong Meiyao and Ding Wei, in hopes that one of them could take over his gambling empire.

Meanwhile, Dong Sihai changed his looks and posed as Huang Yunjiu, a professional gambler, in an effort to avenge his wife's death by getting rid of Qifang. Yunjiu first befriended Shenfeng to join forces against Fei, and later got Xing involved, baiting him with the promise of holding the gambling king throne that Fei holds.

Xing's parents were heartbroken after learning that Xing has turned on them, acknowledging Yunjiu as his mentor. Yunjiu then sent assassins after Qifang, who was saved by a nurse named Jiang Yexue. Yexue was saved by Fei in the past, when Fei helped her out of an immoral deal with Shenfeng, when she tried to pay off her brother's gambling debts. Since that time, Yexue also began to develop feelings for Fei.

Meiyao, the three disciples that Fei chose to pass on his skills to, was later revealed to be Yunjiu’s daughter, and was forced by her father to betray Fei, which caused Fei to have amnesia. Xing then took advantage of the opportunity to force Qifang back to the gambling arena. Qifang was at a loss, with no one to turn to and discovering Fei's amorous relationship with Yexue.

Fei eventually regained his memory, and discovered that Xing had forced his mother into a life-and-death gamble. He then decided to take his wife’s place, hoping that he could bring back Xing’s conscience.

Production 
Portions of the series were shot in Australia, while an entire casino was built in Studio 6 of Mediacorp's former campus at Caldecott Hill for the casino scenes.

Mediacorp spent S$1.5 million on animated special effects for the series.

Cast
Li Nanxing as Yan Fei
Zoe Tay as Luo Qifang
Lee San San as Jiang Yexue
Ken Cai as Yan Xing
Willy Liu as Yan Xing (Older)
Tay Ping Hui as Luo Shenfeng/Luo Yingfeng
Huang Yiliang as Huang Yunjiu/Dong Sihai 
Allan Wu as Ding Wei
Vivian Lai as Dong Meiyao
Cassandra See as Luo Wenxin
San Yow as Jiang Xueming
Wang Deyuan as Wu Youkang
Joey Swee as Jia Jia
Henry Thia as Ding Shiyi
Le Yao as Jiang Xiaotong
Jin Yinji as Auntie Qian

Accolades

References

External links
 Official Website (Via Wayback Machine)
 Official page on Toggle

Singapore Chinese dramas
2003 Singaporean television series debuts
2003 Singaporean television series endings
2000s Singaporean television series
2002 Singaporean television seasons
Channel 8 (Singapore) original programming